Sidney Ellis Chandler (30 May 1901–1961) was an English footballer who played in the Football League for Preston North End and Reading.

References

1901 births
1961 deaths
English footballers
Association football forwards
English Football League players
Southall F.C. players
Aston Villa F.C. players
Preston North End F.C. players
Reading F.C. players